Agafonov (masculine) or Agafonova (feminine) is a Russian surname. It derives from the given name Agafon, borrowed from Greek, where it meant kindness, goodness.

The following people share this surname:
Aleksandr Agafonov (born 1975), Uzbekistani Olympic swimmer
Alexandra Agafonova, Russian swimmer, silver medalist at the 2014 IPC Swimming European Championships – Women's 50 meter backstroke
Alisa Agafonova (born 1991), Ukrainian figure skater
Andrey Agafonov (born 1979), Russian association football player
Kseniya Agafonova (born 1983), Russian long-distance runner
Mikhail Agafonov, Russian operatic tenor
Nikolai Agafonov (born 1947), Soviet and Russian association football player and coach
Pavel Agafonov (born 1907), Russian expert pilot during World War II
Polina Agafonova (born 1996), Russian figure skater

Igor Agafonov (born 1995),
Russian guy

See also
Agafonova, alternative name of the rural locality (a village) of Agafonovo in Odintsovsky District of Moscow Oblast, Russia
Agafonovo, several rural localities in Russia

References
Notes

Sources
Ю. А. Федосюк (Yu. A. Fedosyuk). "Русские фамилии: популярный этимологический словарь" (Russian Last Names: a Popular Etymological Dictionary). Москва, 2006. 

Russian-language surnames